The Nemi language is a Kanak language spoken by 320 people in the north of New Caledonia, in the commune of Hienghène. Dialects include Ouanga, Ouélis, and Kavatch.

Phonology 
Nemi features labiovelarized plosives and voiceless nasals.

Vowels in Nemi have a two way length distinction.

References

Bibliography

External links
 Information about the Nemi language

New Caledonian languages
Languages of New Caledonia
Definitely endangered languages